Joseph Hill Sinex (October 7, 1819 – October 6, 1892) was an American politician from Pennsylvania who served as a member of the Philadelphia City Council in 1861 and as a Republican member of the Pennsylvania House of Representatives for Philadelphia County from 1883 to 1884.

He served as captain in the 17th Pennsylvania Infantry Regiment in 1861 and as captain and lieutenant colonel in the 91st Pennsylvania Infantry Regiment from 1861 to 1864. He fought in some of the key battles in the Eastern Theater of the American Civil War including the Battle of Fredericksburg, Battle of Chancellorsville, Battle of Gettysburg and was wounded at the Battle of Spotsylvania.

Early life
Sinex was born on October 7, 1819 in Stanton, Delaware. He moved to Philadelphia and married Mary C. Duffield on October 29, 1848.  Together they had six children, four that survived to adulthood. He worked as a house carpenter and builder.

Military career

He was mustered into service as captain of Company D of the Seventeenth Pennsylvania Infantry Regiment in April 1861 and was discharged in August. He joined the 91st Pennsylvania Infantry Regiment in December 1861. He fought at the Battle of Fredericksburg and the Battle of Chancellorsville.  He was promoted to lieutenant colonel on July 10, 1864 and led 258 men at the Battle of Gettysburg and suffered the loss of 3 soldiers and 16 wounded in that battle. He was wounded at the Battle of Spotsylvania Court House and was mustered out of service on July 10, 1864 due to his wounds.

Political career
He served as a member of the Philadelphia City Council in 1861 and as a Republican member of the Pennsylvania House of Representatives for Philadelphia County from 1883 to 1884.

He worked as a liquor dealer and hotel keeper. He died in Philadelphia on October 6, 1892 and was interred at Mount Moriah Cemetery.

References

External links
Joseph Hill Sinex at Find A Grave

1819 births
1892 deaths
19th-century American businesspeople
19th-century American politicians
American carpenters
American hoteliers
Burials at Mount Moriah Cemetery (Philadelphia)
Republican Party members of the Pennsylvania House of Representatives
Military personnel from Philadelphia
People from New Castle County, Delaware
People of Pennsylvania in the American Civil War
Philadelphia City Council members
Politicians from Philadelphia
Union Army colonels